2010 World Masters Athletics Indoor Championships is the fourth in a series of World Masters Athletics Indoor Championships (also called World Masters Athletics Championships Indoor, or WMACi). This fourth edition took place in Kamloops, Canada, from 2 to 7 March 2010.

This is the first WMACi to be hosted outside of Europe.

The main venue was Tournament Capital Centre Fieldhouse,

which has a flat indoor track.

Supplemental venues included McArthur Island Park for Cross Country and Race Walk, and Kamloops Golf and Country Club for Half Marathon.

This Championships was organized by World Masters Athletics (WMA) in coordination with a Local Organising Committee (LOC): Judy Armstrong and Bob Cowan.

The WMA is the global governing body of the sport of athletics for athletes 35 years of age or older, setting rules for masters athletics competition.

A full range of indoor track and field events were held.

In addition to indoor competition, non-stadia events included Half Marathon,

8K Cross Country, 10K Race Walk, Weight Throw, Hammer Throw, Discus Throw and Javelin Throw.

Results
Official results are archived at kamloops2010masters.

Past Championships results are archived at WMA.

Additional archives are available from European Masters Athletics

as a pdf book,

from British Masters Athletic Federation

in HTML format,

and from Masters Athletics

in HTML format.

USATF Masters keeps a list of American world record holders.

Several masters world records were set at this Indoor Championships. World records for 2010 are from kamloops2010masters unless otherwise noted.

The "8000 Meter Run" published in the result archives should actually be "8K Cross Country",

so the world records listed for the 8K may have been incorrectly recorded, and none of these records are documented in List of masters world records in road running.
A similar clerical error is in 2015 World Masters Athletics Championships.
The Half Marathon records may also be clerical errors, as every age group winner was reported as setting a world record.

Women

Men

References

External links

Team Canada results
Team USA
Team USA
Team USA
USA medals
Olga Kotelko The Incredible Flying Nonagenarian

World Masters Athletics Championships
World Masters Athletics Championships
International track and field competitions hosted by Canada
2010
Masters athletics (track and field) records